Kulikov, or Kulikova (feminine; Кулико́ва), is a common Russian last name and may refer to the following:

People
Anatoly Kulikov (b. 1946), a Russian Minister of the Interior in 1995-1997
Dmitri Kulikov (b. 1977), an Estonian football player
Dmitri Kulikov (b. 1990), a Russian ice hockey player
Irina Kulikova (b. 1991), a Russian fashion model
Ivan Kulikov, (1875–1941), a Russian painter
Vasily Kulikov (1923–1991), a Soviet army officer and Hero of the Soviet Union
Vasily Kulikov (1921–1943), a Soviet army officer and Hero of the Soviet Union (posthumously)
Viktor Kulikov (1921–2013), a Soviet military leader and Marshal of the Soviet Union
Viktor Nikolayevich Kulikov (1913–1948), a Soviet aircraft pilot and Hero of the Soviet Union
Yevgeny Kulikov (b. 1950), a Soviet speed skater
Yuri Kulikov (b. 1949), a Russian  industrialist, manager, public figure.

Places
 Kulikov, a town in Lviv Oblast in Ukraine

Russian-language surnames